Love For Our Elders (formerly Love for the Elderly) is a United States-based nonprofit organization that aims to alleviate social isolation among older adults.

History 
As a regular volunteer at his local senior living community, Jacob Cramer recognized chronic loneliness prevalent among the residents. In 2013, he began handwriting kind, uplifting letters for senior living communities, a program that has since sent hundreds of thousands of cards and engaged more than 50,000 volunteers across 70 countries.

The organization compiled videos and seniors' stories during the coronavirus pandemic for elders it could not reach due to mailing restrictions.

On September 15, 2020, the organization announced its new name, Love For Our Elders. A statement from its founder said, "We’ve come to realize that our organization’s name included language that contradicted the work we pour our hearts into every day," citing work at University of Washington School of Social Work.

Press 
In 2016, Jacob spoke on the organization's initiatives on national daytime talk show Harry. Later that year, it was featured on the cover of American Profile.

Its work has been featured in CNN, Glamour, O, The Oprah Magazine, Parade, National Geographic, Rede Record, The Boston Globe, NPR, and USA Today. The organization was one of three nonprofits named by Dick Clark's New Year's Rockin' Eve as a 2022 Culture Catalyst.

Annually, the organization hosts Letter to an Elder Day on February 26, encouraging others to write a letter to an elder who inspires them.

References 

Organizations established in 2013
Charities based in Ohio